Lyda Morehouse (born November 18, 1967) is a science fiction and fantasy author.  Her first four books, the AngeLINK series (Archangel Protocol, Fallen Host, Messiah Node, and Apocalypse Array), blend cyberpunk technology with unconventional religious themes.  She is the winner of multiple national awards, including the Philip K. Dick Award's Special Citation of Excellence (2005), Shamus Award for Original Paperback featuring a Private Investigator (2001), and the Barnes & Noble Maiden Voyage Award for debut science fiction novel (2001).

Under the name Tate Hallaway, Morehouse also wrote the Garnet Lacey series (Tall, Dark and Dead, Dead Sexy, Romancing the Dead, Dead If I Do, and Honeymoon of the Dead), the Vampire Pricess of St. Paul young adult series (Almost to Die For, Almost Final Curtain, and Almost Everything); the paranormal mystery Precinct 13 and its web serial sequel Unjust Cause; and (with Rachel Calish) the young adult novel Song of Secrets (The School For Wayward Demons, Bk. 1).  She also wrote the short story "Fire and Ice and Linguini for Two", appearing in the anthology Many Bloody Returns.

In 2009, she donated her archive to the department of Rare Books and Special Collections at Northern Illinois University.

References

External links

 Lyda Morehouse's website
 

1967 births
Living people
21st-century American novelists
American fantasy writers
Cyberpunk writers
American science fiction writers
American women short story writers
American women novelists
Shamus Award winners
Women science fiction and fantasy writers
21st-century American women writers
21st-century American short story writers